Nicrophorus carolina is a burying beetle described by Carl Linnaeus in 1771. Its specific name has commonly been misspelled as carolinus.

References

Silphidae
Beetles of North America
Beetles described in 1771
Taxa named by Carl Linnaeus